Laurence A. Knapp (May 30, 1905 – November 8, 1976) was an American field hockey player who competed in the 1932 Summer Olympics and 1936 Berlin, Germany.

He was born in Garden City, South Dakota as Laury Knapp, and died in Washington, D. C.

In 1932 he was a member of the American field hockey team, which won the bronze medal. He played two matches as forward.

Four years later he was a member of the American field hockey team, which lost all three matches in the preliminary round and did not advance. He played one match as forward.

As a young attorney in New York City, he played and practiced with team members in Rye, N.Y. For both Olympic games, the team members had to pay for equipment and passage to Los Angeles and to Germany. He observed that the Germans (Nazis) were quite agitated by the performance of the American blacks who won many medals instead of the natives. Mr. Knapp said that the Indians and Pakistanis were robust and troublesome to beat at the game. Before he died, he expressed a sadness that the sport was no longer admired as it once was and eliminated from the Olympic lineup of more glamorous components. In New York, during the early 1930s, Mr. Knapp frequented the Savoy Ballroom and other venues where he met Benny Goodman, Fats Waller, Teddy Wilson and many other popular jazz musicians of that period. He and Benny developed a great friendship that survived through the following three decades. Larry spent time with Benny in Los Angeles, prior to Benny marrying Alice Hammond, granddaughter of William Henry Vanderbilt. Alice's brother, the notorious producer and talent scout of Columbia Records fame, John Hammond, introduced Benny to his sister. At one point, while Benny was playing an engagement in L.A., Larry visited him at his hotel, where he delighted in finding Alice staying with Benny, which, although a bit risque for the era, Larry found exiting for Benny's future happiness. Larry introduced his youngest son, Andrew, to the music that he had collected over the decades on disc. The introduction of root American jazz deeply affected Andrew, who has maintained a vast collection of recorded music, on disc, since his late teens. Indirectly, John Hammond is responsible for having brought such a vast American treasure to one that Hammond never knew. Besides the jazz, Hammond, from the recordings at Columbia, also exposed Andrew to Delta blues. In the late '60s, Andy met Nicholas Perls in Washington, D.C. At the time, Perls operated a small business of transcribing country blues (Delta) onto reel to reel tapes that were sent to all parts of Europe, where there was a tremendous thirst for American blues recordings from the early 20th century. In part, the surge of British blues bands during the '60s (John Mayall and others), was the result of Mr. Perls transcription service. Perls returned to Manhattan in about 1969 and began forming Belzona Records (later Yazoo, the result of a trademark threat from an English manufacturer, Deltona Records). Yazoo, until Perls' death in 1985, produced a continuing series of country blues reissue albums, famous for their clarity and editing, taken from discs that were manufactured decades prior.

Nick Perls, along with John Fahey, Stefan Grosman, Tom Hoskins, Firk, and others from the D.C. group, spent many summers canvassing small southern towns for existing 78 RPM records, practically the only remaining source of esoteric black blues that had been field recorded, or recorded in small makeshift studios, during the 1920s, '30s and '40s by a series of known and unknown record labels. Their canvassing efforts preserved one of the most important American music legacies.

When he moved to Washington, D.C., from New York, he was recruited by the Roosevelt Administration into the Department of Labor for purpose of prosecuting Ford Motor Company, in Detroit. Ford was employing "strike breakers" to intimidate employees and to discourage collective bargaining. In 1976, Mr. Knapp had changed his perspective on the overall effects of unionization. It was his opinion, based upon years of practice as an administrative law judge for the NLRB, that unions had far exceeded the beneficial intentions upon which they were conceived. He said that unions had perpetrated greed, a sense of entitlement and a stranglehold upon industry, especially the American automobile manufacturers to whom he originally brought suit, and won, back in 1939. He went on to say that the union excesses had created an artificial burden on the consumer, who is forced to pay more for each product, without receiving any additional benefit for the additional, artificial cost the unions imposed.

In 1940, he married Kortryc Collier, a beauty originally from Cardiff, Wales. Kortryc had been a risk-taking adventurer. As a young woman, she made her way to central Europe, spending much time in Scandinavia, including Lappland, skiing and working. In the mid 1930s, she visited Germany where Hitler and the Nazis had gained considerable power. She found the evolving social conditions there deplorable and fearsome, so she departed Europe for Canada. In Canada, she worked at a winter resort owned by a White (Tzarist) Russian with whom she began a romance. After about a year, she married him, the Marquis d'Albizi and became the Marquesa d'Albizi. The Marquis, as it turned out, was obsessed with Kortryc and, besides physical abuse, would lock her in her apartments, accessible to him, only. Kortryc escaped with the help of a resort guest, Barbara Korff, with whom she travelled to Washington, D.C. in the late 1930s. Mrs. Korff gave Kortryc employment as the friend and caregiver for Mrs. Korff's aging mother. Barbara Korff was fluent with Washington society, the likes of Abe Fortas, Fritz Eichholz, Alfred and Jeannie Friendly, he being the managing editor of The Washington Post newspaper. Eventually Mrs. Korff introduced Kortryc to her friends, one of whom was Larry Knapp, a newly established member of what was considered the upper crust of D.C. at that time. Larry's legal accomplishments and his participation in the most recent Olympic matches made him a person of interest. Larry began dating Kortryc until marrying her a brief time later.

Their marriage became extremely rocky. Even while dating, there were signs of incompatibility. Their friends warned them both not to marry, but neither took heed. After 25 years, they divorced. Kortryc Knapp died in June 1976, Greensboro, North Carolina.

External links 
 
 profile

1905 births
1976 deaths
American male field hockey players
Field hockey players at the 1932 Summer Olympics
Field hockey players at the 1936 Summer Olympics
Olympic bronze medalists for the United States in field hockey
Medalists at the 1932 Summer Olympics